Gornozavodsky District is an administrative district (raion) of Perm Krai, Russia; one of the thirty-three in the krai. Municipally, it is incorporated as Gornozavodsky Municipal District. It is located on the western slopes of the Ural Mountains in the east of the krai. Its administrative center is the town of Gornozavodsk. Population:  The population of Gornozavodsk accounts for 46.3% of the district's total population.

Geography
The landscape of the district is hilly in the west and mountainous in the east. Climate changes from southwest to northeast, where it becomes more cold and humid. Main rivers include the Vilva, the Vizhay, the Koyva, and the Usva.

A part of the Basegi Nature Reserve occupies the north of the district.

History
Human settlement of this territory started in the early 17th century, when iron ore was found. Several metallurgical plants were later constructed. In the end of the 19th century, the Perm–Yekaterinburg was constructed, contributing to the development of the region. The district in its modern borders was established on November 4, 1965, when it was split from Chusovskoy District.

Demographics
Most of the inhabited localities in the district are concentrated along the Perm-Nizhny Tagil railroad and along the Koyva River.

Ethnically, Russians account for 88.4% of the population, Tatars are distant second at 4.9%, followed by Ukrainians at 1.7%.

Economy
Timber and metallurgical industries and manufacture of building materials form the basis of the district's economy.

References

Notes

Sources

Districts of Perm Krai
States and territories established in 1965